MMHI may stand for:

Mendota Mental Health Institute — Wisconsin hospital
Michael & Michael Have Issues — television series